Paratimia is a genus of long-horned beetles in the family Cerambycidae. There is one described species in Paratimia, P. conicola.

References

Further reading

 
 

Spondylidinae
Articles created by Qbugbot